Lake Chaupicocha may refer to:

 Lake Chaupicocha (Lima), a lake in Lima Region, Peru
 Lake Chaupicocha (Puno), a lake in Puno Region, Peru